Osvaldo Paulo João Diniz (born on 4 June 1986) is an Angolan footballer who plays as a central midfielder for Desportivo da Huíla.

In 2018, he was loaned to Desportivo da Huíla in Angola's premier league, the Girabola.

References

External links 
 

1986 births
Living people
Association football midfielders
Angolan footballers
Angola international footballers
2013 Africa Cup of Nations players
C.D. Primeiro de Agosto players
Angola A' international footballers
2016 African Nations Championship players